Bonnie Lynn Bernstein (born August 16, 1970) is an American sports journalist and executive. She has been named one of the most accomplished female sportscasters in history by the American Sportscasters Association. Bernstein is Vice President, Content and Brand Development, of Campus Insiders, as well as the on-air "face" of the network. Additionally, she freelances for The Dan Patrick Show, ESPN, espnW and DirecTV and serves as a guest commentator on several news networks, including MSNBC, NBC and FOX News Channel.

Biography

Early life and education
Bernstein was born to a Jewish family in Brooklyn, New York, and grew up in Howell, New Jersey. She was salutatorian of her class at Howell High School, where she is a member of the school’s hall of fame. She attended the University of Maryland, where she graduated magna cum laude with a degree in broadcast journalism. She was a four-time Academic All-America in gymnastics, receiving the Thomas M. Fields award for excellence in academics and athletics. Bernstein maintains close ties to her alma mater, serving on the Board of Visitors for the Philip Merrill College of Journalism at the University of Maryland and the advisory board for the Povich Center for Sports Journalism. She also hosts TerpVision, a quarterly television program showcasing the University and its notable alumni.

Early career
Bernstein spent three years climbing the local broadcast ladder, launching her career as the news and sports director at WXJN-FM radio in Lewes, Delaware. She transitioned to television at WMDT-TV in Salisbury, Maryland as the ABC affiliate's weekend news anchor, then became Reno, Nevada's first-ever female weekday sports anchor at NBC affiliate KRNV-TV.

ESPN
Bernstein first joined ESPN in 1995 as its Chicago Bureau Chief, where she covered Michael Jordan and the Chicago Bulls' record-setting championship run (1996–98). She also served as a correspondent for Sunday NFL Countdown and College GameDay and filed reports for SportsCenter during the Major League Baseball post-season and the NCAA Women's Division I Basketball Championship.

CBS Sports
Bernstein joined CBS Sports in 1998 as the lead sideline reporter for the NCAA Men's Basketball Championships and feature reporter for The NFL Today. She transitioned to sideline reporting for the NFL on CBS. She worked with the Verne Lundquist/Dick Enberg and Dan Dierdorf crew until 2003, when she was promoted to the lead crew of Jim Nantz and Phil Simms. Bernstein covered Super Bowls XXXV and XXXVIII for the network and during Super Bowl XXXVIII, she became the first correspondent ever to cover the game for both network television and network radio, filing reports for CBS Sports and Westwood One Radio.

Upon signing with CBS/Westwood One Radio in 2001, Bernstein often pulled "double duty" during the NFL season, covering a Sunday game for CBS and Monday Night Football for radio.

During the 2003 NCAA Men's Basketball Championship, Bernstein was involved in an incident with University of Kansas basketball coach Roy Williams. After the Jayhawks narrowly lost to Syracuse, Bernstein, during her post-game interview, inquired about the North Carolina vacancy to which Williams had been linked. Williams, visibly perturbed, suggested a producer forced Bernstein to ask the question, and said, "I could give a shit about North Carolina right now. I've got thirteen kids in that locker room that I love." Williams later apologized for his on-air profanity and accepted the North Carolina job one week later. Responding to the incident, CBS Sports President Sean McManus said, "Bonnie's questions were appropriate. They had to be asked, and her performance was totally professional."

In addition to her NFL and college basketball duties, Bernstein also hosted the NCAA Women's Gymnastics championship and CBS' Emmy-nominated anthology series, Championships of the NCAA, and served as a studio host for CBS SportsDesk and At The Half, CBS Sports' college basketball halftime studio show. Bernstein also covered tennis, track and field, horse racing and figure skating for the network and has hosted the U.S. Open Tennis Championships and the Hambletonian.

Return to ESPN
In January 2006, Bernstein left CBS to and rejoined ESPN in July as a field reporter for Sunday Night Baseball on ESPN with Jon Miller and Joe Morgan and college football reporter for ESPN on ABC. On October 11, 2006, five days after experiencing severe leg pain while covering the Texas-Oklahoma Red River Rivalry, doctors discovered life-threatening blood clots in both of Bernstein's lungs (pulmonary emboli) that originated in her left leg (deep vein thrombosis). She returned to ESPN and ABC several weeks later, but reduced her travel schedule the following season as a precautionary health measure, shifting focus to studio hosting many of ESPN’s high-profile shows, including NFL Live, Jim Rome Is Burning, Outside the Lines, First Take and College Football Live.

Radio hosting
In September 2009, Bernstein was named co-host and SportsCenter anchor for The Michael Kay Show on 1050 ESPN Radio in New York. She also covered the New York Jets and hosted specialty programming during the 2009–10 NFL playoffs. In July 2010, Bernstein was given her own daily NFL show, New York Football Live, co-hosted by Jets linebacker Greg Buttle.

Campus Insiders
In April 2013, Bernstein was named vice president of Content and Brand Development for Campus Insiders, a digital partnership between Silver Chalice Ventures, founded by Chicago Bulls and White Sox owner Jerry Reinsdorf, and IMG College, the nation's largest collegiate sports marketing company. Bernstein is also the on-air "face" of the network, hosting a daily studio show during the college football season and NCAA Basketball Championship. Her off-air responsibilities include creating original programming for the network, developing and securing new sponsor partnerships, and designing brand extensions that enhance the reach of CI's digital and social platforms.

Other broadcast work
Bernstein is the only female fill-in host for the award-winning syndicated radio and TV program, The Dan Patrick Show and appears as a guest commentator on several news networks, including NBC, MSNBC and FOX News Channel, to discuss prominent sports stories.

Outside of sports, Bernstein appeared as a "post-game" reporter on the Sklar Brothers' 2014 comedy special What Are We Talkin' About?

Outside endeavors
Bernstein's philanthropic efforts focus on two areas: childhood obesity and deep vein thrombosis awareness. She is a media strategist and national ambassador for ING KiDS ROCK, one of the nation's largest school-based running programs. In 2010, she co-chaired the coalition supporting congressional passage of the National Foundation on Fitness, Sports and Nutrition, which raises private funds for childhood obesity initiatives. Bernstein is also the co-national spokesperson for the Coalition to Prevent Deep Vein Thrombosis, raising awareness about the disease she was diagnosed with in 2006.

Bernstein's hairstyles have been honored by voters at the celebrity hair website Super-Hair.Net with a record 24 "Crown Awards," beginning in 2002 and most recently in 2009.

Notes and references

External links

American television sports announcers
American sports radio personalities
Howell High School (New Jersey) alumni
People from Howell Township, New Jersey
Women sports announcers
Maryland Terrapins women's gymnasts
American television reporters and correspondents
Sportspeople from Brooklyn
Tennis commentators
Major League Baseball broadcasters
American horse racing announcers
Figure skating commentators
College football announcers
National Football League announcers
College basketball announcers in the United States
Gymnastics broadcasters
Track and field broadcasters
1970 births
Living people
Jewish American journalists
American women television journalists
University of Maryland, College Park alumni
21st-century American Jews
21st-century American women